Francis Drouin  (born October 7, 1983) is a Canadian Liberal politician, who was elected to represent the riding of Glengarry—Prescott—Russell in the House of Commons of Canada in the 2015 federal election.

Early life

Drouin was born and raised in Hawkesbury, Ontario. After obtaining a diploma in business administration from La Cité collégiale, he attended the University of Ottawa, where he earned a bachelor's degree in commerce.  He worked as a special assistant to Ontario Premier Dalton McGuinty for four years, and then joined a government relations firm as a communications consultant.  He continued to work as a consultant in various capacities thereafter.  He has volunteered on the board of his alma mater, La Cité.

Federal politics

Drouin joined the Liberal Party when he was 17 years old, and served for two years as president of the Young Liberals in Glengarry—Prescott—Russell.  He managed the Liberal campaigns there in the 2011 federal and 2014 provincial elections.  Drouin won the federal Liberal nomination for the 2015 federal election in January 2015.  He won the election, unseating three-term Conservative incumbent Pierre Lemieux by over 10,000 votes.

On December 3, 2021, he was appointed Parliamentary Secretary to the Minister of Agriculture and Agri-Food.

Controversies

In April 2018 Drouin was alleged to have groped a woman at a Halifax bar during the Liberal Party policy convention. Drouin denied the allegations stating he was misidentified. Police did not lay charges.

Electoral record

References

External links
 MP Website
 Official Website

1983 births
Living people
Liberal Party of Canada MPs
Members of the House of Commons of Canada from Ontario
University of Ottawa alumni
Franco-Ontarian people
La Cité collégiale alumni
21st-century Canadian politicians